The Maccabees were Jewish rebel warriors who fought against Ancient Greco-Roman Hellenization in the 2nd Century BC.

Maccabees may also refer to:

Music
 The Maccabees (band), English indie rock band
 Maccabeez, an affiliate group of the Wu-Tang-Clan

Other
 Books of the Maccabees, deuterocanonical books
 Knights of the Maccabees, fraternal organization
 Maccabees Building in Detroit, Michigan
 Maccabees, a neighborhood patrol organization in Crown Heights, Brooklyn from 1964 to 1971

See also
 Maccabi (disambiguation)
 Maccabeus (disambiguation)
 Maccabiah (disambiguation)
 The Maccabaean, early 20th century American magazine
 Maccabaeans
 The Maccabeats, band from Yeshiva University